Philodoria pipturicola is a moth of the family Gracillariidae. It was first described by Otto Swezey in 1915. It is endemic to the Hawaiian islands of Oahu and Maui.

The larvae feed on Pipturus species. They mine the leaves of their host plant. The mine starts as a serpentine gallery but later becomes a blotch. The larva emerges to spin a light brownish cocoon on some convenient surface. The larvae are about 7 mm long and pale yellowish.

The pupa is 3 mm long and very pale brownish.

External links

Philodoria
Endemic moths of Hawaii